Martin Tůma (born 15 September 1985) is a Czech professional ice hockey defenceman who last played for the Danbury Hat Tricks of the Federal Prospects Hockey League. He was selected by the Florida Panthers in the 5th round (162nd overall) of the 2003 NHL Entry Draft.

Playing career
Tůma played junior hockey in HC Litvínov's system in the Czech Republic. After his third season with HC Litvínov's junior team, he was drafted 162nd overall in the 2003 NHL Entry Draft by the Florida Panthers. Tůma subsequently moved to North America to play major junior hockey in the Ontario Hockey League (OHL) with the Sault Ste. Marie Greyhounds.

After completing the 2004–05 OHL season, Tůma turned professional and began playing in the Panthers' farm system in the American Hockey League (AHL) and ECHL. After stints with the San Antonio Rampage, Rochester Americans and Florida Everblades, Tůma returned to his native Czech Republic to play for HC Litvínov of the Czech Extraliga. For the 2012-2013 season Martin signed with the Nottingham Panthers of the Elite Ice Hockey League before being signed on 27 November 2012 by Braehead Clan.

International play
Tůma has made one appearance for the Czech Republic internationally at the 2005 World Junior Championships in the United States where he earned a bronze medal.

Career statistics

Regular season and playoffs

International

References

External links
 

1985 births
Living people
HK Acroni Jesenice players
Braehead Clan players
Motor České Budějovice players
Columbus Cottonmouths (SPHL) players
Czech ice hockey defencemen
Dornbirn Bulldogs players
Florida Everblades players
Florida Panthers draft picks
HC Litvínov players
HC Most players
HK Nitra players
Nottingham Panthers players
IHC Písek players
Rochester Americans players
San Antonio Rampage players
Sault Ste. Marie Greyhounds players
HC Slovan Ústečtí Lvi players
HC Tábor players
Sportspeople from Most (city)
Czech expatriate ice hockey players in the United States
Czech expatriate ice hockey players in Canada
Czech expatriate ice hockey players in Slovakia
Czech expatriate ice hockey people
Expatriate ice hockey players in Slovenia
Czech expatriate sportspeople in Slovenia
Expatriate ice hockey players in England
Czech expatriate sportspeople in England
Expatriate ice hockey players in Scotland
Czech expatriate sportspeople in Scotland
Expatriate ice hockey players in Austria
Czech expatriate sportspeople in Austria